The Ballarat Gaol, a former maximum security prison for males, females and children, is located in Ballarat, Victoria, Australia. Replacing temporary structures including prison hulks in the Bay of Port Phillip and holding yards in Ballarat, the gaol operated between 1862 and 1965.

The remaining gate, gate house, and cloisters are now home to the Collaborative Research Centre in Australian History (CRCAH) of Federation University Australia.

History and structure

The report of the Select Committee on Prison Discipline of September 1857 recommended gaol buildings replace the Port Phillip Bay prison hulks. The inquiry recommended adopting London's Pentonvillle design of 1842 to build the gaols. This prison design carried on a revolution begun in 1829 by Eastern State Penitentiary in Philadelphia. The complex was based on a central hall from which radiated wings of cells. The principle of the design being that one guard would stand in the centre of the hall and at one glance survey all cells.

The construction of the gaol began in 1856 and the first cell blocks were completed by 1857. It was completed in 1862 with 58 cells designed to hold a mixture of 74 male and female prisoners. In 1862 a tunnel was constructed to join the gaol to the adjacent Ballarat Courthouse, allowing for the safe transfer of prisoners.

In 1872 Captain Moonlite, a bushranger and Anglican clergyman, escaped from the gaol.

The prison was closed in 1965.

Current use
Most of the gaol was demolished to allow the School of Mines Ballarat to expand onto the site. The remaining structures at the site include the main gate, warden's residence and governor's residence. These buildings are now used by Federation University. The old warden's residence is now home to the Australian Centre for Research into Injury in Sports and its Prevention (ACRISP).

The site is listed on the Victorian Heritage Register.

Executions
During its time in use as a gaol, the following individuals were executed by public hanging at Ballarat Gaol:

References

Gaol
Defunct prisons in Victoria (Australia)
History of Victoria (Australia)